Fernando Ariel Brandán (born 15 November 1980) is an Argentine former professional footballer who played as a midfielder.

References
 
 

1980 births
Living people
Argentine sportspeople of Italian descent
Argentine footballers
Association football midfielders
Argentina international footballers
Gimnasia y Tiro footballers
Universitario de Sucre footballers
Club Olimpia footballers
Club Real Potosí players
Querétaro F.C. footballers
Provincial Osorno footballers
Argentine expatriate footballers
Argentine expatriate sportspeople in Chile
Expatriate footballers in Chile
Argentine expatriate sportspeople in Bolivia
Expatriate footballers in Bolivia
Argentine expatriate sportspeople in Mexico
Expatriate footballers in Mexico
Argentine expatriate sportspeople in Paraguay
Expatriate footballers in Paraguay
People from Salta
Sportspeople from Salta Province